John Mutorwa (born 17 August 1957) is a Namibian politician and current Minister of Works and Transport. A member of the South West Africa People's Organization (SWAPO), Mutorwa has served in the National Assembly of Namibia as well as the cabinet since 1992.

Early life and education 
Born at Nyangana in Okavango Region, Mutorwa attended the University of Fort Hare, from where he graduated in 1984. He earned a B.A. in 1995 from the University of Namibia. In 2002, he earned a master's degree in Interdisciplinary studies from the University of Montana.

Following his education at Fort Hare, Mutorwa returned to Kavangoland, where he worked as a teacher and principal from 1985 to 1990. He also worked for reconciliation efforts, serving as Secretary of the Repatriation, Resettlement and Rehabilitation of Roman Catholic Justice and Peace Commission from 1988 to 1989.

Political career 
Following Namibian independence in 1990, Mutorwa joined government as regional commissioner for Kavango, Omega, and Tsumkwe. In 1992 he became a member of both parliament and cabinet. He was appointed deputy minister of water affairs in the Office of the President in 1992 and deputy Minister of Fisheries and Marine Resources in 1994.

In 1995, he was promoted to head the Ministry of Basic Education, Culture and Sport, remaining there until 2005. When that ministry was split in 2005, he retained the Youth, National Services, Sport and Culture ministerial portfolio, and in 2010 he was moved to the post of Minister of Agriculture, Water and Forestry. Under the presidency of Hage Geingob, Mutorwa was retained in his post as minister of agriculture, water and forestry in March 2015. In February 2018, Mutorwa was appointed Minister of Works and Transport.

References

1957 births
Living people
Members of the National Assembly (Namibia)
People from Kavango Region
University of Fort Hare alumni
University of Namibia alumni
University of Montana alumni
Namibian expatriates in South Africa
SWAPO politicians
Works and transport ministers of Namibia
Agriculture ministers of Namibia
Education ministers of Namibia
Youth ministers of Namibia
Sports ministers of Namibia